Omar Visintin (born 22 October 1989) is an Italian snowboarder, specializing in snowboard cross, for which he won a silver and a bronze medal for at the Beijing 2022 Olympic Winter Games.

Visintin competed at the 2014 Winter Olympics for Italy. In the snowboard cross, he finished 2nd in his 1/8 round race, then 2nd in his quarterfinal. However, he did not finish his semifinal and did not start the small final, finishing 12th overall.

As of September 2014, his best showing at the World Championships is 22nd, in the 2013 snowboard cross.

Visintin made his World Cup debut in March 2008. As of September 2014, he has two World Cup victories, the first coming at Montafon in 2012–13. Visintin was the 2013–14 World Cup overall winner in snowboard cross.

Visintin competed in the 2022 Winter Olympics in Beijing, where he earned a bronze medal in the men's snowboard cross.

World Cup Podiums

References

External links
 
 
 
 
 

1989 births
Living people
Olympic snowboarders of Italy
Snowboarders at the 2014 Winter Olympics
Snowboarders at the 2018 Winter Olympics
Snowboarders at the 2022 Winter Olympics
Medalists at the 2022 Winter Olympics
Olympic medalists in snowboarding
Olympic silver medalists for Italy
Olympic bronze medalists for Italy
Sportspeople from Merano
Italian male snowboarders
X Games athletes
Universiade medalists in snowboarding
Universiade silver medalists for Italy
Competitors at the 2011 Winter Universiade
21st-century Italian people